Dr Ali Ahmed S Kazi (1896–1970) was one of the few physicians in Sind Province when Sindh was created as a province in British India in 1936.

Family
He was born in 1896 and was a nephew of the great intellectual Allama I. I. Kazi and his illustrious wife Elsa Kazi. His father, Sharafuddin Kazi died when he was still quite young.

Career
Dr A. S. Kazi played a pioneering role initially in creating the Liaquat Medical College now the Liaquat University of Medical and Health Sciences from the existing medical school at Hyderabad. Subsequently he directed his attention to the strengthening and consolidation of the Dow Medical College at Karachi. He was appointed as the first Medical Superintendent of Civil Hospital Karachi  in 1949. Subsequently in 1952, he was appointed Director [presently Director General] Health Services for the Sindh province. He retired from service in 1955.

Life after retirement
He devoted his time to writing books on clinical subjects and psychology. One of his books on psychology is a textbook for the Masters in Psychology course at the University of Sindh.

Death
Dr Kazi died in 1970 leaving behind his widow Ayesha, a son - the late Mr Ahmed Hussain A Kazi - a civil servant who was a Secretary to the Government of Pakistan from 1974–1979, three grandchildren Nilofer Qureshi, Safdar Kazi and Ghulam Nabi Kazi.

See also
 Khan Bahadur Ghulam Nabi Kazi
 Ahmed Hussain A. Kazi
 Justice Mushtak Ali Kazi
 Justice Bashir Ghulam Nabi Kazi
 Mutawakkil Kazi
 Civil Hospital Karachi

References

1896 births
1970 deaths
Sindhi people
Pakistani humanists
Pakistani psychologists
20th-century Indian medical doctors
20th-century psychologists